Tenaniʻa (c. 1770–1814) was king of the island of Huahine. Huahine is an island located among the Society Islands, in French Polynesia. Tenaniʻa became a king in 1793 after he deposed Teriitaria I, his half-brother.

See also
Kingdom of Huahine
List of monarchs of Huahine

References 

Oceanian monarchs
Huahine royalty
Year of birth uncertain
1814 deaths
1770 births